Herskowitz is a surname. Notable people with the surname include:

 Ira Herskowitz (1946–2003), American geneticist
 Mickey Herskowitz (born 1933), American journalist and biographer

Jewish surnames